The 1960 winners of the Torneo di Viareggio (in English, the Viareggio Tournament, officially the Viareggio Cup World Football Tournament Coppa Carnevale), the annual youth football tournament held in Viareggio, Tuscany, are listed below.

Format
The 16 teams are organized in knockout rounds. The round of 16 are played in two-legs, while the rest of the rounds are single tie.

Participating teams

Italian teams

  Bologna
  Fiorentina
  Genoa
  Lazio
  Milan
  Roma
  Sampdoria
  Torino
  Udinese

European teams

  Partizan Beograd
  Šibenik
  Dukla Praha
  Bayern München
  Bordeaux
  Levski Sofia
  Vasas Budapest

Tournament fixtures

Champions

Footnotes

External links
 Official Site (Italian)
 Results on RSSSF.com

1960
1959–60 in Italian football
1959–60 in Yugoslav football
1959–60 in German football
1959–60 in French football
1959–60 in Czechoslovak football
1959–60 in Bulgarian football
1959–60 in Hungarian football